Date and time notation in Sweden mostly follows the ISO 8601 standard: dates are generally written in the form YYYY-MM-DD. Although this format may be abbreviated in a number of ways, almost all Swedish date notations state the month between the year and the day. Months are not capitalised when written. The week number may also be used in writing and in speech. Times are generally written using 24-hour clock notation, with full stops (dots or periods) as separators, although 12-hour clock notation is more frequently used in speech.

Date
In Sweden, the ISO 8601 standard is followed in most written Swedish, but older forms remain. Dates are generally and officially written in the form YYYY-MM-DD, for instance 2001-08-31 for 31 August 2001, or using the full format. Dates can also be shortened, allowing for two-digit years, so the dates are usually written in the form YY-MM-DD, which means that 31 August 2001 can also be written as 01-08-31. One can also omit the hyphens, leaving the notation as 010831.
Older forms for 31 August 2001 are 31/8 2001, or with the two-digit notation 31/8 -01. The common trait for all Swedish date notations is that the month (August or 8) always is between the year (01) and the day (31st). Months are not capitalised when written using letters (i.e. , not ).

The "month, day, year" notation ("08-31-2001") is not used in Swedish, but may be used in Lule Sami, Northern Sami and Southern Sami languages.

The numbering of weeks is frequently used in companies and schools, and is simply expressed as in "() 32" (week) 32 in both writing (abbreviated ) and speech. On labels and in computer notation, the year may also be included, as in "2006W32". As in the ISO standard, the week begins on a Monday and week 1 is the week containing the year's first Thursday.

Time
Times are written with the 24-hour clock, with full stops as separators (although colons are sometimes used instead of full stops). However, seconds are usually left out if the additional precision is not required; for example: , or sometimes . Leading zeros are mostly used in time notation (i.e. 04.00 is more common than 4.00). In spoken Swedish however, the 12-hour clock is much more common. The written notation can be pronounced directly with the equivalent of "and" between the hour and minute, although this is not very common in everyday conversation. The 24-hour time is always applied on the last form, may be applied to the second form and is never used with rounded time as in the first form. Seconds are very seldom expressed at all in speech. For example: 14.27 may be pronounced as "" (three minutes to half three), "" (twenty seven (minutes) past two/fourteen), or, most commonly: "" (fourteen and twenty seven). 16.00 may be pronounced as "" (four) or "" (sixteen). Usually time is rounded to the nearest multiple of 5 minutes. Examples of ways of expressing time in spoken Swedish (transliterated into English):
 Six (6 am or pm)
 20 (minutes) past seven
 10 (minutes) to eight
 Quarter past nine (kvart över nio)
 Quarter to eleven (kvart i elva)
 Half two (1:30) (note that this is different from the British expression "half two", the latter being short for "half past two", i.e. 2:30)
 Five (minutes) to half three (2:25)
 Five (minutes) past half four (3:35)

In these styles, the word for "minutes" is usually but not always left out.

References 

 https://www.ibm.com/support/knowledgecenter/SSEPGG_11.5.0/com.ibm.db2.luw.admin.nls.doc/doc/r0004572.html

Time in Sweden
Sweden